John Bonds (born February 6, 1970) is a former American football quarterback who played two seasons in the Arena Football League with the Arizona Rattlers and Memphis Pharaohs. He first enrolled at Arizona State University before transferring to Northern Arizona University. He was also a member of the Arizona Cardinals of the National Football League.

References

External links
Just Sports Stats

Living people
1970 births
American football quarterbacks
Arizona State Sun Devils football players
Northern Arizona Lumberjacks football players
Arizona Rattlers players
Arizona Cardinals players
Memphis Pharaohs players
Players of American football from Phoenix, Arizona